The Rollin 60s Neighborhood Crips  is a street gang based in Los Angeles, California, originally formed in Los Angeles in 1976 from the Westside Crips and having since spread to other cities in the United States. Membership is estimated to be around 1,600 people, making it one of the largest gangs in the Los Angeles area. According to a news outlet in 2004, Rollin' 60s was "the largest black criminal street gang in the City of Los Angeles".

Members identify themselves by wearing the Seattle Mariners or Chicago White Sox logos and mark areas they are in with graffiti.

Two men identified as members of the Rollin' 60s were arrested for the 1984 murders of four members of professional football player Kermit Alexander's family. Police say the gang members got the address wrong and killed the wrong family.

Musician, businessman, and community activist Nipsey Hussle was a member of the Rollin 60s Neighborhood Crips.

References

Organizations established in 1976
1976 establishments in California
Crips subgroups
African-American organized crime groups
Gangs in California